Toli Choopulone is a 2003 Indian Telugu-language romance film directed by Kasi Viswanath and produced by Ramoji Rao. The film stars newcomers Kalyan Ram and Akanksha in the lead roles, while Suman plays a pivotal role. The film's music was composed by Chakri. This film marked the entry of Kalyan Ram into Telugu cinema as a lead actor and was Rao's 75th film as a producer.

Cast

Kalyan Ram as Raju
Akanksha as Bhanu
Suman as Srikar Prasad, Bhanu's father
Sarada 
Sudeepa 
Kalpana
Venu Madhav 
Charan Raj
Sunil as White and White Simhachalam, Raju's friend
Surya
MS Narayana
Brahmanandam
LB Sreeram
Venu Madhav
Ironleg Sastry
Bhagawan
Master Anand Vardhan
Ahuti Prasad
Raghu Babu
Ravi Babu
Telangana Shakuntala as a railway ticket collector
 Vajja Venkata Giridhar

Soundtrack
The music for the film was composed by Chakri. For the audio release function, producer D. Ramanaidu was the chief guest. Actor Venkatesh and director S. V. Krishna Reddy were also present.

Release 
Idlebrain gave the film a rating of three out of five stars and praised Kalyan Ram's performance and the comedy. However, The Hindu opined that "The director has nothing new to offer as the film unfolds on predictable lines".

References

External links
 

2003 films
2000s Telugu-language films
Films scored by Mani Sharma
Films scored by Chakri